José María Ortiz de Mendíbil Monasterio (11 August 1926 – 15 September 2015), also known as José María Ortiz, was a Spanish referee, active from 1953 to 1973.

Life and career
Mendíbil was born in Portugalete, Basque Country, Spain.

During his 18 seasons in La Liga, between 1953 and 54 and 1972 and 73, he led 241 league games. He was promoted to international status the seasons 1958 and 1959, and was in it until the end of his career. 
He was the referee when Inter Milan beat Liverpool 3-0 in the 1965 European Cup semi-final second leg in a controversial game which subsequently let to claims that he had accepted bribes to facilitate an Inter Milan victory. 

On 24 May 1972 he took charge of the European Cup Winners' Cup Final played at the Camp Nou, Barcelona. The match between Rangers FC of Scotland and the Russian aces Dynamo Moscow who served up a five goal thriller with Rangers running out 3-2 victors in the end.

In his retirement, he was a partner in UEFA and pioneer in Spain with the programs of TVE, where he worked for 5 years, apart from collaborating in programs Cadena SER and Tele Bilbao. He died in Algorta, Spain in September 2015.

References

External links 
 

1926 births
2015 deaths
People from Portugalete
Spanish football referees
UEFA Euro 1968 referees
UEFA European Championship final referees
Sportspeople from Biscay